Bener Meriah Regency is a regency in Aceh Special District, Indonesia. It is located on the island of Sumatra. The regency covers an area of 1,941.61 square kilometres and it had a population of 122,277 at the 2010 census and 161,342 at the 2020 census; the official estimate as at mid 2021 was 164,522. Its capital is the town of Simpang Tiga Redelong. Until 2003 the present territory of this regency was the northern part of the Central Aceh Regency, from which it was split away.

Administrative districts 
As at the 2010 census, the regency was divided administratively into seven districts (kecamatan). However, since 2010 three additional districts - Bener Kelipah, Gajah Putih and Mesidah - have been created by the division of existing districts. The ten districts are listed below with their areas and their populations at the 2010 census and the 2020 census, together with the official estimates as at mid 2021. The table also includes the locations of the district administrative centres and the number of villages (rural desa and urban kelurahan) in each district.

Note: (a) the 2010 population of these three districts is included in the figure for the preceding districts, from which they were subsequently split away.

Bener Meriah Regency covers the former northern part of the Central Aceh Regency, and is bordered by Bireuen, North Aceh and Central Aceh regencies.

References

External links 
 Bener Meriah Regency 
 UU RI No.41 Tahun 2003 

Regencies of Aceh